Fláithrí Ó Corcrán, Irish singer and harpist, d. 1496.

Ó Corcrán bore a surname held by at least two unrelated clans; one was a Brehon family from County Fermanagh, a second was situated in Munster. It is uncertain to which, if either, family Fláithrí belonged.

The Annals of the Four Masters record his death, sub anno 1496:
 Florence O'Corcoran, player on the harp and other stringed instruments, and a distinguished vocalist died.

See also
 Brian Ó Corcrán
 Felimidh Ó Corcrán
 Cahalan Ó Corcrán

References
 http://www.ucc.ie/celt/published/T100005D/
 http://www.irishtimes.com/ancestor/surname/index.cfm?fuseaction=Go.&UserID=

Irish male singers
Irish harpists
15th-century Irish musicians
Irish-language singers